José Manuel Joly Braga Santos, ComSE (May 14, 1924July 18, 1988) was a Portuguese composer and conductor, who was born and died in Lisbon. He wrote six symphonies.

Biography
José Manuel Joly Braga Santos was born in Lisbon in 1924 and died in this city in 1988, at the peak of his musical creativity. Having studied violin and composition at the National Conservatoire of Lisbon, he became a disciple of Luís de Freitas Branco (1890–1955), the leading Portuguese composer of the preceding generation.

After the Second World War, he was able to go abroad, having studied conducting with Hermann Scherchen and Antonino Votto, and composition with Virgilio Mortari. In 1945 he visited England where he met Ralph Vaughan Williams, who encouraged him to use his native folksong in his symphonic music and also suggested that he should take lessons in counterpoint. He was undoubtedly the leading Portuguese symphonist of the 20th century, and perhaps of all time. Apart from an innate sense of orchestration, his musical language is based on a strong musical architecture as well as drama, with long melodic phrases and a natural instinct for structural development. In his own words, he wanted “to contribute toward a Latin symphonism and to react against the predominant tendency, of the generation that preceded me, to reject monumentalism in music”.

In his first works, the composer showed a modal tendency motivated by the desire to establish a connection between contemporary music and the golden age of Portuguese music: the Renaissance. We also find a melodic outline of the oldest folk songs of his country. Although he was not particularly interested in the Portuguese folklore, studying and composing at the country home of his mentor, in the rural south of Portugal - the Alentejo - he naturally accepted the influence of the very old local folklore that he considered "of mesmerizing originality and grandeur".

The first four symphonies, which followed each other quite rapidly (between the ages of 22 and 27), were immediately performed by the Portuguese Radio Symphony Orchestra in Lisbon, and met with great success. The conductor and founder of the Portuguese Radio Symphony Orchestra was the great Portuguese conductor Pedro de Freitas Branco, a friend of Maurice Ravel, Manuel de Falla, and former director of the Orchestre Lamoureux. Pedro de Freitas Branco early recognised his brother’s pupil’s talent and launched Joly Braga Santos's international career during the 1950s, conducting several international premieres of his works around Europe. Other works of this period are the Concerto for Strings, Variations on an Alentejo Theme, and three Symphonic Overtures. Most of the works were recorded, from the 1970s onwards, by the Portuguese label Strauss SP, and more recently, by the Naxos / Marco Polo label.

Following closely the works of post-war European composers, his style became, from 1960 onwards, more chromatic. The period of travel and the time he devoted to conducting provided him with what he described as a useful period of rest, decisive for the evolution of his musical style toward increased chromaticism and less traditional form. To this period belong the works Three Symphonic Sketches, Sinfonietta, the Requiem, his 5th and 6th Symphonies, and Divertimento no. 2.

Joly Braga Santos also wrote three operas, chamber music for a wide variety of instruments and ensembles, film scores, and several choral works based on poems from the great classical and modern Portuguese and Spanish poets such as Camões, Antero de Quental, Teixeira de Pascoaes, Fernando Pessoa, Garcilaso de la Vega, Antonio Machado and Rosalía de Castro.

Joly Braga Santos lectured on composition at the National Conservatoire of Lisbon, where he introduced the chair of Musical Analysis. He was also director of the Oporto Symphony Orchestra and one of the founders of the Juventude Musical Portuguesa (Portuguese Musical Youth). As a critic and journalist he produced a vast range of work for several Portuguese and foreign newspapers and journals.

He died in Lisbon, of a stroke.

Awards
The Three Symphonic Sketches (1962) were distinguished by Donemus in 1963, and the 5th Symphony, by the «Tribune Internationale des Compositeurs» (UNESCO) in 1966.

In 2004, the recording of the Symphony No. 4 by Naxos/Marco Polo, performed by the National Symphony Orchestra of Ireland and conducted by Álvaro Cassuto received the Cannes Classical Award for the CD Premier category.

Honors
In 1977, Joly Braga Santos was distinguished with the Order of Santiago de Espada by António Ramalho Eanes, the President of the Portuguese Republic.

Selected works

Opera
1958 – Mérope, Opera in 3 Acts, on a play by Almeida Garrett; Soprano, Tenor, Bass, 3 Baritons, Choir and Orchestra - 95'; Premiere: Lisbon, 1959, S. Carlos Theater, conducted by the author.
1970 – Trilogia das Barcas, Opera based on three plays by Gil Vicente; “To my Daughters”; 20 parts (singers and actors) double choir, orchestra and sound recording 120'; Premiere: Lisbon, 1970, Gulbenkian Festival; Nicola Rossi-Lemeni, Maria Oran, Carmen Gonzales, Hugo Casais,; Alvaro Malta, Ana Lagoa. Gulbenkian Orchestra and Choir, conducted by Gianfranco Rivoli.

Ballet
1967 – Encruzilhada (Crossings) - Ballet; 2,2,2,2 2,2, Tp. Perc. 2, M., strings 30'; Premiere: Lisbon 1968, Gulbenkian Ballet; Recordings: Marco Polo 8.225216, 2001.

Symphonies
1947 – Symphony No. 1 (in D) - "To the Heroes and Martyrs of the last World War"; 3,3,3,3 4,3,3,1 – Tp., Perc. 2, strings 40'; Premiere: Lisbon 1947, National Radio Symphony Orchestra, 	; Pedro Freitas Branco, conductor; Recordings: Strauss SP 4112 of live concerto 1960 - CD issue 1996; Strauss SP4048 1989;	Marco Polo 8.223879 1997.
 1948 – Symphony No. 2 (in B minor) 3,3,2,2 4,3,3,1 Tp. 2, Perc. 1, strings. 60'; Premiere: Lisbon, 1948, National Radio Symphony Orchestra,; Pedro de Freitas Branco. International Premieres: Paris, 1948, Orch. Radiodifusion Française, Pedro de Freitas Branco conductor. Rome, 1959 Orchestra della R.A.I., Frederico de Freitas, conductor; Recordings: Marco Polo 8.225216, 2001. 
1949 – Symphony No. 3 (in C M) "To Luis de Freitas Branco"; 2,2,2,2 4,3,3,1 Tp., Perc.4, H. 2, strings 37'; Premiere: Lisbon, 1949, National Radio Symphony Orchestra,; Pedro de Freitas Branco, conductor; Recordings: Strauss SP8770022 1986; Marco Polo 8.225087 1997. 
1950 – Symphony No. 4 (in E m) " To the Portuguese Musical Youth"; 3,3,3,3 - 4,4,3,1 Tp., Perc.4, H., strings - 50'	; Premiere: Lisbon 1951, National Radio Symphony Orchestra,; Joly Braga Santos, conductor; Score for Orchestra and Choir, 1968; Premiere: National Radio Symphony Orchestra, Gulbenkian Choir,; Silva Pereira conductor, 1968; Recordings: Strauss SP4059, 1989; Marco Polo 8.225233, 2003.
1966 – Symphony No. 5 op.39 -"virtus lusitaniae"; 4,4,5,4 6,4,3,1 Tp. 2, Perc. 9, Piano, Celesta, H. 2, strings - 31'; Premiere: Lisbon 1966, National Radio Orchestra, conducted by the author. Distinguished by the Tribune International des Compositeurs (UNESCO) -1968. Recordings: Strauss SP4043 1968; CD issue 1989; Marco Polo 8.223879, 1997.
1972 – Symphony No. 6 “To my Daughter Maria da Piedade”; Soprano solo, Choir 3,3,4,3 4,4,3,1-Tp. Perc. 4, Celesta, H. 2, strings 28'. Premiere: Lisbon, 1972, Tivoli Theatre, National Radio Symphony Orchestra, S. Carlos Theatre Choir, soloist soprano Elsa Saque, Álvaro Cassuto conductor. Recordings: Marco Polo 8.225087, 1997.

Orchestral
1946 – Symphonic Overture No. 1 "To Pedro de Freitas Branco";3,3,3,3 4,3,3,3, Tp. Perc. 2, strings 7'; Premiere: Lisbon 1946, National Radio Symphony Orchestra, 	; Pedro de Freitas Branco, conductor.
1947 – Symphonic Overture No. 2 (in E); 3,3,3,3 4,4,3,1 Tp. Perc.3, strings 15'; Premiere: Lisbon 1947, National Radio Symphony Orchestra, Pedro de Freitas Branco, conductor.
1948 – Elegy to Vianna da Motta 3,3,3,3 - 4,3,3,1 Tp., Drum, strings 9'; Premiere: Lisbon, 1949, National Radio Symphony Orchestra,; Pedro de Freitas Branco, conductor; Recordings: Strauss SP4053, 1989; Koch-Shwaan 3-1510-2, 1994. 
1951 – Concerto for Strings in D - "To the Chamber Music Academy"; Strings Orchestra 18'	; Premiere: Lisbon, 1951, Chamber Music Academy; Recordings: 	Strauss SP 870017/PS, 1986;	Koch Schwann 3-1510-2, 1994;	Marco Polo 8.225186, 2002.
1951 – Variations on an Alentejo Theme "To Pedro de Freitas Branco"; 3,3,3,3 4,4,3,1 Tp., Perc. 4, H.2, strings - 14'; Premiere: Bordeaux 20.02.1952, Orchestre Philharmonique de Bordeaux, Pedro de Freitas Branco conductor; Recordings: Strauss SP4053, 1989; Marco Polo 8.225233, 2003.
1954 – Symphonic Overture No. 3 "To Elisa de Sousa Pedroso"; 2,2,2,2 4,2,3,1, Tp., Perc.3, H., strings 13'; Premiere: Lisbon, 1954, National Radio Symphony Orchestra, 	; Pedro de Freitas Branco, conductor; Recordings: Strauss SP4048, 1989.
1960 – Divertimento I "To Virgilio Mortari"; 2,2,2,2 2,2 Tp. Perc. 2, strings, 24'; Premiere: Naples 1961, Orchestra Scarlatti della R.A.I., conducted by the author; Recordings: Strauss 870017/PS, 1989;	Marco Polo 8.225271, 2004.
1962 – Three Symphonic Sketches "To Silva Pereira"; 3,2,2,2 4,3,3,1-Tp. Perc. 4, Celesta, strings - 11'; Premiere: Lisbon, 1962, National Radio Symphony Orchestra,; Silva Pereira conductor; Donemus Prize 1963; Recordings: Strauss SP4053/PS, 1989.
1963 – Sinfonietta for Strings Orchestra, 18';"To Álvaro Cassuto and the Gulbenkian Orchestra"; Premiere: Lisbon 1963, Gulbenkian Orchestra, Álvaro Cassuto conductor; Recordings:	Strauss CD870017/PS, 1986;	Koch - Shwaan 3-1510-2, 1994;	Marco Polo 8.225186, 2002.
1967 – Variations for Orchestra "To Adrian Sunshine"; Strings Orchestra, Harp, 2 Violins, Viola, Cello 16'; Premiere: Lisbon, 1967, Gulbenkian Festival. Gulbenkian Orchestra; Adrian Sunshine conductor. 
1978 – Divertimento II – String Orchestra 14'; Premiere: Lisbon 1978, Gulbenkian Orchestra, Gustav Kuhn conductor; Recordings: Koch Shwann 3-1510-2, 1994;	 Marco Polo 8.225271, 2004.
1988 – Staccato Brilhante – “To The New Phylarmonic Orchestra”; Premiere: Lisbon 1988, The New Phylarmonic Orchestra, conducted by Álvaro Cassuto.

Concertante works
1947 – Nocturne for Strings (in B minor) - Strings Orchestra and viola 7'; Premiere: Lisbon 1947, National Radio Strings Orchestra; Pedro de Freitas Branco, conductor; Recordings: Marco Polo 8.225271, 2004.
1960 – Viola Concerto "To François Broos"; 2,2,2,2 4,3,3,1 Tp. Perc. 3, H., strings - 28' 30"; Premiere: Lisbon 1960, National Radio Symphony Orchestra; François Broos, viola; conducted by the author. Recordings: Strauss SP870008/PS, 1989.
 1968 – Violin and Cello Concerto for String Orchestra and Harp - 18'; Premiere: Lisbon, 1970, National Radio Symphony Orchestra; Fritz Rieger, conductor; Soloists: Leonor Prado (violin), Madalena Sá e Costa (cello); Recordings: Marco Polo 8.225186, 2002.
1973 – Piano Concerto; 3,3,2,2 4,3,3,1 Tp. Perc.3, cordas 24'; Premiere: Lisbon 1974, National Radio Symphony Orchestra; soloist, Helena de Sá e Costa, Silva Pereira conductor.
1987 – Cello Concerto - 2,2,2,2 - 2,2 - 1,2 - strings; Premiere: Lisbon 1987, Gulbenkian Orchestra, Clélia Vital soloist; Recordings: Marco Polo 8.225271, 2004.

Chamber music
1942 – Nocturne (in E) Violin and Piano 4'. Premiere: Lisbon, 1942; Soloists: Silva Pereira (violin) and João de Freitas Branco (piano).
1943 – Aria I Cello and Piano 4'. Premiere: Oporto, 1943; Soloists: Madalena Sá e Costa and Helena Sá e Costa.	
1945 – String Quartet I (in D m) - "To Luís de Freitas Branco"; 2 violins, viola e cello, 30'; Premiere: Lisbon, 1945. Soloists: l. Gomes, J. Nogueira, F. Caldeira, C. Figueiredo; Recordings: Strauss SP 4356 1990.
1957 – Quartet with piano piano, violin, viola and cello 18' "To the Lisbon Quartet"; Premiere: Würtzburg 1957, Residenz Hall, by the Lisbon Quartet.
1957 – String Quartet II 2 violins, viola and cello 30';Premiere: 1989, S. Carlos Theater, Capela Quartet;Recordings: Strauss SP 4356 1990.
1977 – Aria II – Cello and Piano 6' “To Luisa de Vasconcelos"; Premiere: Madrid 1977, Luísa de Vasconcelos, soloist.
1984 – Aria a Tre con variazioni for Clarinet, Viola and Piano;Premiere: Lisbon 1984, Goethe Institut, Diogo Pais (clarinet), Leonor Braga Santos (viola) and António Chagas Rosa (piano).	
1984 – Dance Suite Piano, Viola, Oboé and Bass;Premiere: Lisbon 1986, Opus Ensemble; Recordings: EMI Valentim de Carvalho – EMI 7496622, 1988, Opus Ensemble.
1985 – Trio for Piano, Violin e Cello - “To the Mirecourt Trio”; Premiere: Lisbon 1986, by the Mirecourt Trio.
1985 – Suite for wind instruments; Premiere: Lisbon, 1985, Lisbon Wind Ensemble. Recordings: Numérica, Lisbon, 1997. Lisbon Soloists.Deux Elles Limited, 2003 DXL 1084, The Galliard Ensemble. 
1986 – Sextet - To Alberto Lysy;2 Violins, 2 Violas, 2 Cellos;Premiere (original score): Lisbon, 1989;Strings Orchestra score,1986.Premiere: 1986, Algarve Festival, Gulbenkian Orchestra.
1988 – Improviso for clarinet and piano. Premiere: Naples, Italy 1988; António Saiote, clarinet; Last composition.

Vocal
1943 – Four Songs on poems by Fernando Pessoa for Soprano voice and piano. Premiere: Lisbon 1946; International premiere: Dublin 2004. 
1945 –  Sonnet by Antero de Quental - “To Carmélia Âmbar”; Mezzo-soprano and Orchestra; Premiere: (with piano) Lisbon, 1953.
1964 – Requiem "In memoriam of Pedro de Freitas Branco"; 3 Sopranos, 1 Mezzo, Tenor, Bariton, Bass, Choir; 4,4,5,4 4,4,3,1 Tp., Perc. Sistro, celesta, H.3, strings - 35'; Premiere: Lisbon, 1964, Gulbenkian Festival, Gulbenkian Orchestra and Choir, António 	de Almeida, conductor.
1974 – Choral compositions on Classic Castilian Poems – "A Capella" Choir; Premiere: Avila Festival, Spain 1974. Iglesia del Salvador, Gulbenkian Choir.
1975 – 2 Motets – “A Capella” Choir 6' 30"; Premiere: Cuenca Festival 1976. Iglesia de San Miguel, Gulbenkian Choir. 
1982 – Cantares Gallegos for Soprano e Orchestra on poems by Rosalía de Castro, “To Maria Oran”.
1988 – Aquella Tarde on a dramatic poem by António Machado. Soprano or tenor and orchestral ensemble; Premiere: Lisbon, 1988 - Gulbenkian Encounters of Contemporary Music, by the Contemporary Music Group, conducted by Jorge Peixinho.

Solo piano	
1944 – Siciliana Piano 2'. Premiere: Lisbon, 1944. Published by Valentim de Carvalho S.A.R.L. (out of print).
1945 – Three Sonnets by Camões - "To Carmélia Âmbar"; Original score for Mezzo-Soprano or Baritone and Piano; Score for Mezzo-Soprano or Baritone and Orchestra; Premiere: Lisbon, 1970, Lisbon Phylarmonic Orchestra, Helena Cláudio, soloist, Joly Braga Santos, conductor.

Discography
Symphony 3
Concerto for Strings, Sinfonietta, Variationes Concertantes, Concerto for violin, cello, strings and harp
Symphony 4

References

Sources

 Latino, Adriana. "Santos, Joly Braga", Grove Music Online, ed. L. Macy (Accessed July 8, 2007), (subscription access)
 Who’s Who in Music,
 Marquis Who’s Who,
 Dictionnaire de La Musique (Marc Honnegger)
 The World of Twentieth-Century Music.
 Delgado, Alexandre "A Sinfonia Em Portugal" ed. Caminho Da Musica

20th-century classical composers
Portuguese classical composers
1924 births
1988 deaths
People from Lisbon
Portuguese male classical composers
20th-century male musicians